Bolt is a supervillain in the DC Comics Universe.

Publication history
Bolt first appeared in Blue Devil #6 (November 1984) and was created by Gary Cohn, Dan Mishkin, Paris Cullins, and Ernie Colón.

Fictional character biography

Larry Bolatinsky
Larry Bolatinsky is a special effects artist and assassin. He designed a special suit that gives him the power to teleport and project energy blasts. Now calling himself Bolt, he has faced the superheroes Blue Devil, Captain Atom, and Starman (Will Payton).

Bolt appears in Suicide Squad #63–66 (March through June 1992) as part of a more villainous version of the Squad propping up the dictatorship in the island of Diabloverde. Amanda Waller and her Squad take out him and his colleagues while attempting to remove the dictator.

He joins a sub-group of assassins that call themselves the Killer Elite. One of their many battles puts them up against the merc team called the Body Doubles. Bolt is hospitalized in an off-panel battle.

He joins the third incarnation of the Suicide Squad and apparently dies on his first mission alongside Killer Frost, Putty, Eliza and Larvanaut. He falls through a shaft, breaks his leg and is attacked by killer ants. He is seen dead in the hands of Killer Frost. He later turns up alive again in the pages of Identity Crisis #1 and is badly injured by two street kids, suffering a punctured lung and two punctured kidneys. He has since joined The Society. His seemingly miraculous resurrections have been noted by other characters, most notably during his recovery from his gunfire-related injuries.

Bolt is member of Luthor, Joker and Cheetah's Injustice League Unlimited and is one of the villains featured in Salvation Run. He is one of the villains sent to retrieve the Get Out of Hell free card from the Secret Six.

Bolt is later killed by his son Dreadbolt who uses his own suit's teleporting ability to send him into a brick wall. He has been identified as one of the deceased entombed below the Hall of Justice. He was subsequently revived as a member of the Black Lantern Corps.

Terry Bolatinsky
Bolt's son Terry Bolatinsky appears in Teen Titans #55. He initially attempts to befriend Blue Devil's former sidekick, Kid Devil, before revealing he is following in his father's footsteps as Dreadbolt. He tries to persuade Kid Devil to join his team, the Terror Titans, but when Kid Devil refuses, he joins the rest of the Terror Titans in defeating him. Later, at the request of the new Clock King, he is sent to help defeat Ravager, who already took out Persuader and Copperhead. He threatens to kill Wendy and Marvin, but Ravager calls his bluff and defeats him alone. He regroups with his teammates and attempts to take her down again, but is apparently killed in the ensuing explosion caused by Ravager breaking a gas pipe. He is later revealed to have used the teleportation system in his suit to get himself and his teammates to safety. 

In the Terror Titans miniseries, Dreadbolt is tasked by Clock King to kill his father, thereby proving himself worthy to lead his fellow Terror Titans. Clock King then renames him Bolt when he finally does. Disruptor, having lost favor from Clock King to Ravager, tried to manipulate Terry into killing her, but Terry was not fooled. When Clock King sets in motion his plan to destroy Los Angeles with an army of brainwashed metahumans, Ravager sets out to stop him. Bolt and the Terror Titans battled her, only to be outmaneuvered. Miss Martian, who had posed as one of the metahumans, freed the others from their brainwashing, and they came after the Terror Titans. Retreating to Clock King's lair for help, Bolt and the others are aghast to see Clock King kill Disruptor for her failure, and leave them at the mercy of the oncoming metahumans. Bolt offers to hold them off while his teammates get away, but they insist on fighting together and are eventually subdued, with Dreadbolt being defeated by electromagnetic-powered superhero Static. Two weeks later, Bolt and the remaining Terror Titans escape from custody, planning revenge on Clock King.

Current
A new villain inspired by Bolt debuted as part of a team of supervillains hired by Prometheus. He later appeared, hired by Calculator, to help kidnap the Birds of Prey and kill Oracle. Calling himself Current, he explains that he worked with the late Larry Bolatinsky and wished to carry on his legacy.

Infinite Frontier
Following DC's "Infinite Frontier" relaunch, an incarnation of Bolt (possibly Larry or Current) appears as a member of the Suicide Squad under Peacemaker. He is immediately killed by an unstable Talon of the Court of Owls the team was meant to rescue.

Skills and equipment
Larry Boltanisky is a skilled electrical engineer and thief. Thanks to a special suit that he designed, Bolt can teleport or fly short distances instantaneously. The suit contains an energy blaster, which can also be used as a weapon. 

Terry's suit has all of the same abilities.

References

DC Comics supervillains
DC Comics characters who can teleport
Comics characters introduced in 1984
Fictional assassins in comics
Fictional engineers
Fictional thieves
Suicide Squad members